Henry Herman Leopold Adolph Brose (15 September 1890 – 24 February 1965) was an Australian physicist.

Life 
Born in Adelaide, he attended Prince Alfred College and graduated from the University of Adelaide in 1910 with a B.Sc. in mathematics. A member of the Adelaide University Athletics Club, Brose was awarded a University Blue for Athletics in 1910. In 1911-12 he taught French at Prince Alfred College, and in 1913 was awarded the Rhodes Scholarship for South Australia.

Brose went up to Christ Church, Oxford to study mathematics. While visiting relatives in Hamburg in 1914, he was arrested by the German authorities and interned as a civilian prisoner for the duration of the First World War. During his captivity Brose became interested in the Theory of Relativity and translated some German texts into English. On return to Oxford, he was awarded B.A. and M.A. degrees in 1919, and in 1925 he completed a D. Phil. on the motion of electrons in oxygen, under the supervision of John Sealy Edward Townsend. He then went on to hold a number of academic positions including Lecturer in Physics at the University of Sydney and Professor of Physics at the University of Nottingham. From 1920 and 1936 he translated sixteen physics texts from German into English. Brose later went on to work in cancer research, holding positions as a physicist, a pathologist and a biochemist.

Brose made an enormous contribution to the scientific world of his time both in Australia and across the world, as indicated by his vast collection of Manuscripts still archived in the University of Adelaide.

Personal 
Brose married Australian actress Jean Robertson in London on 14 May 1927. Their son, John Kelvin Brose, was born the following year.

Brose died on 24 February 1965 and was survived by his wife and son.

Trivia
Brose acted as an interpreter when Einstein visited the University of Nottingham in 1930 and 1931.

Notes

Further reading
 Heidi König, General relativity in the English-speaking world: the contributions of Henry L. Brose. In Historical Records of Australian Science, v.17, no.2, Dec 2006, p. 169-195 (ISSN: 0727-3061)

External links
 
 Bright Sparcs Biographical Entry: Henry Brose. University of Melbourne.
 Henry Brose Overview. University of Adelaide.
 About the Records - Henry Brose Guide. University of Melbourne.
 John Jenkin, Brose, Henry Herman Leopold Adolph (1890 - 1965), Australian Dictionary of Biography, Volume 13, Melbourne University Press, 1993, pp 269–270. Retrieved 2008-10-10.
 

Australian Rhodes Scholars
People educated at Prince Alfred College
University of Adelaide alumni
Alumni of Christ Church, Oxford
1890 births
1965 deaths
Academics of the University of Nottingham